is a fictional character from both the Final Fight and Street Fighter series of video games. He is an American Japanophile, as well as a member of the Mad Gear gang.

Appearances

In video games
Sodom originally appeared in the 1989 beat-em-up game Final Fight, where he is the boss of the Subway stage. An underground wrestling promoter dressed in a samurai-style helmet and gear, Sodom fights the player in an underground ring in the Metro City's subway, wielding two katana swords. In 1993's Mighty Final Fight, there are three Sodoms (or Katanas, as the character is called in the English version), known as the Three Katana Brothers.

Sodom's first appearance in the Street Fighter series was in the original Street Fighter Alpha: Warriors' Dreams on 1995. According to Tatsuya Minami, senior manager of Capcom's Product Planning and Design section, Capcom included Sodom in the game because he was popular and easy to translate to the one-on-one fighting genre. In the Alpha series, he is characterized as an American Japanophile, who is greatly fascinated by Japanese culture but misunderstands it. After being defeated by Guy in Final Fight, Sodom recognizes his wrong perception of Japan and travels there to re-educate himself. He develops a new fighting style based on Japanese and Western martial arts and trades his swords for a pair of jitte. In the first Alpha, he seeks to rebuild the Mad Gear gang by defeating his rival Guy in combat. In his ending, he reforms the gang and holds up a poster reading . In his ending in 1996's Street Fighter Alpha 2, Sodom goes to a sumo ring in Japan to seek new members for the reformed Mad Gear and ends up being challenged by E. Honda. In 1998's Street Fighter Alpha 3, he seeks a new hideout for his gang and goes to claim Shadaloo's new underground base as his own when he learns about it from his former ally Rolento. He crashes his truck into M. Bison's Psycho Drive to foil his plot. Though he is presumed by Chun-Li and Charlie to have died in the explosion, Rolento expresses his belief that Sodom may still be alive.

Apart from the Alpha series, Sodom appears as a playable character in 1999's Final Fight Revenge and makes two cameos in 1997's Super Gem Fighter Mini Mix. Sodom makes a cameo in the background of a stage in 2012's Street Fighter X Tekken.

Other appearances
Sodom makes a cameo appearance in the 1999 anime film Street Fighter Alpha: The Animation as a fighter who travels with Ryu, Ken, Chun-Li and some other fighters to Dr. Sadler's laboratory to find and rescue Ryu's alleged younger brother, Shun, though Sodom's comments hint that he is only doing it to prove he is not a coward. As the fighters battle it out to demonstrate their skills to Sadler, Sodom takes on Ken, but is beaten. He and the other fighters are later imprisoned in a cell to have their fighting Ki stripped, but they are released by Ken and Chun-Li.

For Capcom's 15th anniversary of Street Fighter, SOTA Toys released a series of action figures, amongst which was Sodom. The figure was fully posable with 16 points of articulation, and modeled after his Street Fighter Alpha appearance.

Development
In the English-language localization of Final Fight for the Super NES and Sega CD, Sodom was renamed Katana. The name change was repeated in the SNES version of Street Fighter Alpha 2 to maintain consistency. The initial name change was due to its reference to sodomy, as well as a possible religious reference to Sodom and Gomorrah.

In the Street Fighter Alpha games, Sodom is an American character trying to speak Japanese, he is a comedic object of ridicule in his failed attempts at the language. In the Japanese version of Street Fighter Alpha, Sodom's inability to speak fluent Japanese is portrayed in his win quotes by having him use English words that are pronounced similarly to whatever Japanese words he is trying to say with a Japanese translation below.

Sodom wears tabi and geta, gauntlets, blue jeans, body armor, and a samurai kabuto with a mask. On the front of his outfit, Sodom has attempted to scrawl the Japanese kanji shi (死), meaning "death". However, he has not written the kanji properly, and thus its meaning is lost. He is never seen fighting without a pair of jitte or katana swords, making him one of the few characters to appear in the Street Fighter series to use weaponry. In the Japanese version of Final Fight, the katana are named Masamune and Muramasa. In the first two Street Fighter Alpha games, Sodom uses a pair of jitte as weapons instead of his katana blades from Final Fight. However, in Street Fighter Alpha 3, if the player plays as Sodom in X-ism mode, then Sodom will use his katana blades from Final Fight instead of the jitte.

Reception
Sodom was included in the UGO Networks top 50 Street Fighter characters, as well on its list of fighting games' craziest characters, with a comment: "Street Fighter series has seen its share of oddball characters, but few are as goofy as Sodom." Doug Perry from IGN called him a "stupid" character and asked who would ever play him. Complex ranked Sodom as the second "lamest Street Fighter character". In the official poll by Namco, Sodom has been the 32nd most requested Street Fighter side character to be added to the roster of Tekken X Street Fighter, as of August 2012 racking up 3.49% of votes. A fight between Sodom and Yoshimitsu was listed as one of "12 matchups we want to see in Street Fighter X Tekken" by GamesRadar that commented though a "jerk", Sodom "bring some pizzazz to the tired old samurai fashion scene [...] with his 'Samurai Casual' armor and blue jeans." Sodom was one of ten absent characters Heavy.com wished to be added in Ultra Street Fighter IV. GameSpy featured Sodom in their list of "extremely rough brawlers" at 16th place.

References

External links 
Sodom - The Street Fighter Wiki

Fictional criminals in video games
Fictional American people in video games
Fictional gangsters
Fictional samurai
Final Fight characters
Male characters in video games
Street Fighter characters
Video game bosses
Video game characters introduced in 1989